Tetratheca filiformis is a species of flowering plant in the quandong family that is endemic to Australia.

Description
The species grows as a diffuse to prostrate shrub to 40 cm in height. The flowers are pink-purple, appearing from October to January.

Distribution and habitat
The range of the species lies within the Jarrah Forest and Warren IBRA bioregions of south-west Western Australia in the local government areas of Augusta–Margaret River, Denmark, Manjimup and Nannup. The plants grow in damp, sandy areas with winter wet season rainfall.

References

filiformis
Eudicots of Western Australia
Oxalidales of Australia
Taxa named by George Bentham
Plants described in 1863